Neelkamal Puri (born 14 February 1956) is an Indian author, columnist and a college teacher. Born in Ludhiana,  Punjab, she grew up in the princely state of Patiala, where she did her schooling from the Yadavindra Public School. She was one of the first 30 girls to  be admitted to the school, the school being boys only before that.  Since 1979, she has worked as a lecturer in English Literature at different colleges in Patiala and Chandigarh. She is currently teaching Literature and Media Studies at the Government College for Girls, Chandigarh.

Books
Neelkamal Puri has written two novels, The Patiala Quartet published by Penguin India and Remember to Forget published by Rupa Publications. Noted writer Khushwant Singh described The Patiala Quartet as among the best works of English fiction written by a Punjabi. After these stories based in cities she was born in and the city she grew up in, Neelkamal Puri is working next on a collection of short stories Theka Tales.

References

Women writers from Punjab, India
English-language writers from India
Indian women novelists
Punjabi people
Sikh writers
1956 births
Living people
20th-century Indian women writers
20th-century Indian novelists
Panjab University alumni
Writers from Ludhiana
Novelists from Punjab, India